The Personal Health Information Protection Act, (the Act) also known as PHIPA ('pee-hip-ah'), is Ontario legislation established in November 2004. PHIPA is one of two components of the Health Information Protection Act 2004. The Health Information Protection Act, also established in 2004, comprises two schedules: PHIPA (Schedule A) and the Quality of Care Information Protection Act (Schedule B). The PHIPA replaced the Health Cards and Numbers Control Act (SO 1991, c 1).

PHIPA provides a set of rules for the collection, use and disclosure of personal health information by a "Health Information Custodian" (HIC), and includes the following provisions:
 Consent is required for the collection, use and disclosure of personal health information, with few exceptions
 HICs are required to treat all personal health information as confidential and maintain its security
 Individuals have a right to access their personal health information, as well as the right to correct errors
 Individuals have the right to instruct HICs not to share their personal health information with others
 Rules are provided for the use of personal health information for fundraising or marketing purposes
 Guidelines are set for the use and disclosure of personal health information as a secondary use such as research, quality improvement or education
 Accountability is ensured by granting an individual the right to complain if they have identified an error in their personal health information
 Remedies are established for breaches of the legislation

History 

 December 17, 2003: The Health Information Protection Act (Bill 31) was introduced by the first McGuinty government
 January 26, 2004: Public hearing at Standing Committee on General Government held in Toronto 
 February 2, 2004: Public hearing at Standing Committee on General Government held in Sault Ste. Marie, Kingston and London 
 February 9, 2004: and April 28, 2004 Clause-by-clause consideration of the Bill resulting in various amendments 
 May 17, 2004: Bill 31 passed third and final reading with unanimous support in the legislature 
 May 20, 2004: Bill 31 received Royal Assent 
 July 3 - September 3, 2004: Public consultation on regulations 
 November 1, 2004: Schedules A and B of the Health Information Protection Act come into force
 May 18, 2016: passage by the first Wynne government of the Health Information Protection Act 2016, S.O. 2016, c. 6 - Bill 119, to amend the Personal Health Information Protection Act, 2004, to make related amendments, to introduce the idea of an "ELECTRONIC HEALTH RECORD", to repeal and replace the Quality of Care Information Protection Act 2004 with the Quality of Care Information Protection Act 2016, and to amend the Regulated Health Professions Act, 1991

Application 
PHIPA applies to individuals and organizations involved in the delivery of healthcare services. Under the Act, they are referred to as HICs, "prescribed organizations", or "agencies", each with various function.

Health information custodians
A HIC can be any number of individuals or organizations who have custody or control of personal health information.  To elaborate, some examples of an HIC include:
 Healthcare providers such as doctors, nurses, social workers, dentists, psychologists, paramedics, optometrists, physiotherapists, occupational therapists, chiropractors, massage therapists, dieticians, naturopaths and acupuncturists
 Hospitals 
 Long-term care homes and homes for special care 
 Community Care Access Centres 
 Pharmacies 
 Medical laboratories 
 Local medical officers of health 
 Ambulance services 
 Community mental health programs 
 Ministry of Health and Long-Term Care

Agents of health information custodians
An “agent” of an HIC includes anyone who is authorized by the HIC to do anything on behalf of the HIC with respect to personal health information. These actions are for the purposes of the HIC and not the agent.

Examples include:
 Employees of the HIC
 Clinician researchers conducting research under the jurisdiction of the HIC
 Persons contracted to provide services to the HIC where the person has access to personal health information (e.g. copying or shredding service, records management service)
 Volunteers or students who have any access to personal health information

Role of the Information and Privacy Commissioner
The Information and Privacy Commissioner of Ontario (IPC) is appointed by the Legislative Assembly of Ontario and is independent of the government. The IPC is responsible for ensuring that HICs comply with the Act. Under PHIPA, the IPC has the power to review and make rulings about complaints.

When the commissioner receives a complaint, a mediator may be appointed to try to solve the problem. The IPC has various powers to resolve complaints, including the power to order an HIC to:
 Change or stop the way information is collected, used or shared
 Provide access to the record of personal health information
 Correct the record of personal health information

Content 
The Act covers the following subjects relating to personal health information in the province of Ontario:
Section 1: Interpretation and Application sets out of the purpose of the Act. It defines key terms used throughout the Act, such as "health information custodian" and "health information agent".
Section 2: Practices to Protect Health Information details the required practices for the handling of personal health information and health records. Accountability of information is also discussed. 
Section 3: Consent Concerning Personal Health Information discusses consent for the use, collection and disclosure of personal health information. Capacity to consent and characteristics of substitute decision-making are outlined. 
Section 4: Collection, Use and Disclosure of Personal Health Information outlines the situations for when personal health information can be used, collected and disclosed, and for what purposes. 
Section 5: Access to Records of Personal Health Information and Correction summarizes an individual's right of access to their personal health information, and the necessary steps that are taken to correct information within their record if need be. 
Section 6: Admission and Enforcement details the role of the Commissioner in enforcing the Act. 
Section 7: General explains the general applications and details of the Act, including non-retaliation, immunity, Crown liability, reliance on assertion, offences and regulations.

References 

Health law in Canada
Ontario provincial legislation
2004 in Ontario
2004 in Canadian law
Medical privacy legislation
Privacy legislation in Canada